Anacyclus clavata also known as Camomilla tomentosa, Pusteni targok, vit bertram, white anacyclus and white buttons is a member of the genus Anacyclus and the tribe Anthemideae and family Asteraceae.

Distribution

Native
Palearctic
Northern Africa: Algeria, Libya, Morocco, Tunisia
Macaronesia: Lanzarote 
Southwestern Europe: Ibiza, Majorca, Menorca, France, Portugal, Spain
Southeastern Europe: Croatia, Greece, Italy, Malta, Sardinia, Sicily, Turkey
Source: E+M

References

External links

Anthemideae
Plants described in 1807
Flora of North Africa
Flora of Macaronesia
Flora of Southwestern Europe
Flora of Southeastern Europe